Sumegi or Sümegi is a Hungarian surname. Notable people with the surname include:

John Sumegi (born 1954), Australian flatwater canoeist
Pál Sümegi (born 1960), Hungarian geoarchaeologist

Hungarian-language surnames